Ruhstorf (Central Bavarian: Ruaschtoaf) is a municipality  in the district of Passau in Bavaria in Germany.

References

Passau (district)